Soloman may refer to:

 Solomon, spelt Soloman in some languages, a Biblical figure
 Jason Soloman (born 1970), English football player
 King Soloman, a 1996 Indian film with actor Rahman
 Roger Soloman (1939–2021), Canadian educator and politician
 Soloman Hilton, American association football player
 Soloman Sprecher von Bernegg (1697–1758), Habsburg military commander

See also 
 Salamon (disambiguation)
 Salomon (disambiguation)
 Soliman (disambiguation)
 Solomon (disambiguation)
 Solo Man, a subspecies of H. erectus